Acharya Buddharakkhita (1922- 2013) was a Buddhist monk and prolific writer who established the Maha Bodhi Society of Bangalore and its sister bodies. It was inspired by the Maha Bodhi Society of Anagarika Dharmapala, but is functionally independent. He was born in Imphal, Manipur, in 1922. His parents were Vishnupada and Sailavaladevi Bandopadhyaya. 1942, he took part in the Quit India Movement.

He joined the Indian defence services after his graduation from the Institute of Engineering Technology, Calcutta. He participated in World War II, after which he resigned to find truth and freedom. He became a monk in 1948. He travelled all over India and also taught in Sri Lanka and Burma. Finally he established the Maha Bodhi Society in Bangalore to propagate Buddhism.

In 1952, Moonasinghe, niece of the Venerable Anagarika Dhammapala Maha Upasika —a well-known Buddhist in Bangalore, known to the Maharaja donated him a land for Maha Bodhi Society. He also established schools, hostels, hospitals and an artificial limb centre for the society. He had written 150 books and published two periodicals. He was honored with Abhidhaja Aggamaha Saddhammajotika award by the Myanmar government.

He died at Maha Bodhi Society, Bangalore, on 23 September 2013.

Also see
 Bhadant Anand Kausalyayan (1905 – 1988) 
 Rahul Sankrityayan (1893 – 1963)

Books
The Dhammapada: The Buddha's Path of Wisdom. Buddhist Publication Society, 1998. .
 Die Weisheit des Lotus. Philosophie und Praxis buddhistischer Hingabe. .
 Buddhas lebendiges Erbe. Schirner Verlag, 2005. .
 Dem Buddha folgen. Geschichten vom Erleuchteten. Schirner Publisher, .
 Metta. Schirner Verlag Publisher, 2004, .
 Buddhist manual for everyday practice. Paperback Publisher, 1996.
METTA: The Philosophy and Practice of Universal Love. Buddhist Publication Society, Kandy, Sri Lanka, .
Positive Response: How To Meet Evil With Good.  Publisher - Buddhist Publication Society, Kandy, Sri Lanka, 1987
What Meditation Implies. Publisher - Buddhist Publication Society, Kandy, Sri Lanka, 2008
 LIVING LEGACY OF THE BUDDHA. 2002.
Mind Overcoming Its Cankers: An In-depth Study of Mental Effluents in Buddhist Perspective. Publisher - Buddha Vachana Trust, Bangalore. .
 Dem Buddha folgen. Geschichten vom Erleuchteten. Schirner Verlag.
 Invisible protection. Publisher - Buddha Vachana Trust, 2002. 
 Dhammapada: a practical guide to right living. Publisher Suki Hotu Dhamma. .
 Unerschütterlicher Schutz. Schirner, 2007. .
 Halo'd Triumphs. Publisher - Buddha Vachana Trust, Bangalore, 1976. 
 Dhamma. Vol. 2, No. 1 (Editor). 1977
 An Unforgettable Inheritance Part II. Publisher - Buddha Vachana Trust, Bangalore.
 An Unforgettable Inheritance Stories of Dhammapada. Publisher - Buddha Vachna Trust / Swayam Sahaya, Bangalore
 Die Lehre von Karma und Wiedergeburt. Schirner, 2004. .
 Copy of the Dhammapada translated by Acharya Buddharakkhita

References

1922 births
2013 deaths
Indian Buddhist monks
Theravada Buddhist monks
Writers from Manipur
Buddhist writers
Indian National Army personnel
Quit India Movement
Indian independence activists from Manipur
People from Imphal
Indian religious writers
20th-century Indian non-fiction writers